Nephilingis cruentata is an araneid spider with a strikingly red sternum.

Females reach a length of about 24 mm. The legs can be uniformly dark red or brown, or annulated. Males are about 4 mm long.

Taxonomy
The species was first described in 1775 by Johan Fabricius, as Araneus cruentata. In 1887, Eugène Simon transferred it to the genus Nephilengys. In 2013, Matjaž Kuntner et al. decided that four species of Nephilengys were sufficiently different to require an alternative generic placement. Accordingly, they erected the genus Nephilingis with Nephilingis cruentata as the type species.

Distribution
N. cruentata is found in tropical and subtropical Africa and several limited areas of South America (Brazil, northern Colombia and Paraguay), where it has probably been introduced by humans in the late 19th century at the latest.

Name
The species name cruentata is derived from Latin cruentus "bloody", probably referring to the female red sternum.

References

Araneidae
Spiders of Africa
Spiders of South America
Spiders described in 1775
Taxa named by Johan Christian Fabricius